Alfred M. Monfalcone (May 11, 1890 – June 1970) was the mayor of Newport News, Virginia, from January 16, 1956, to September 1, 1956. His is the shortest term of any mayor of the city. It is not clear why he was appointed to such a short term, but the fact that his predecessor, R. Cowles Taylor, had a term expiring December 20, 1955, it is not unreasonable to assume that he took over the mayorship upon the death of Taylor. Monfalcone, for a time, owned a gas station in downtown Newport News that sat next to the Newport News Victory Arch.

References 

Mayors of Newport News, Virginia
1890 births
1970 deaths
20th-century American politicians